is the 32nd single by Japanese entertainer Miho Nakayama. Written by Keiko Yokoyama, the single was released on July 21, 1995, by King Records.

Background and release
"Hurt to Heart (Itami no Yukue)" was used as the theme song of the TBS drama series . The B-side, "I Love You", was used as an insert song in the drama.

"Hurt to Heart (Itami no Yukue)" peaked at No. 10 on Oricon's weekly singles chart. It sold over 319,000 copies and was certified Gold by the RIAJ.

Track listing
All music is arranged by Jerry Hey.

Charts

Certification

References

External links

1995 singles
1995 songs
Japanese-language songs
Japanese television drama theme songs
Miho Nakayama songs
King Records (Japan) singles